A savoury pattie is a battered and deep fried mashed potato, seasoned with sage. It is commonly sold in the British port towns of Hartlepool, Kingston upon Hull, Wirral, Liverpool, North Tyneside, Kirkwall and Thurso. It is a popular item in fish and chip shops, and is consumed either as a snack or as an inexpensive substitute for fish in a fish and chip meal.

There are additional pattie variations such as the meat pattie (corned beef) and the cheese pattie (cheese and onion), although these are not as popular as the savoury version. In certain parts of the North East and Cumbria fish patties are available also known as fish fritters. These consist of a disc of minced fish sandwiched by two slices of potato (rather than mashed potato as in other patties) and covered in batter. In West Yorkshire, these battered delicacies are called fishcakes or in Keighley, these are known locally as a fish scone.
Patties can be of various shapes but are usually round or rectangular. In Hull patties are often consumed in a breadcake (local name for a bread roll or bun) and accompanied with chips; this is known as a "pattie buttie and chips".

When the patties were prepared on an industrial scale in Yorkshire, they were often made by women in white coats and white wellies. The women became known locally as Pattie Slappers and they had a reputation that you should not argue with them. A study into the lives of the Pattie Slappers was created into a memory project with Heritage Lottery Funding in 2012.

A version of the pattie appeared as one of the dishes served up in a heat of Masterchef in 2015, and Ricky Gervais tried one on the BBC programme The One Show.

See also

 List of deep fried foods
 List of potato dishes

References

External links
 Pattieworld - a history of the pattie

British snack foods
Culture in Kingston upon Hull
Potato dishes
Yorkshire cuisine
Deep fried foods